Panangad is a suburban village in Kochi, Kerala state in India. It lies in the skirts of Kochi Bypass. Located only 7.5 km from Vytilla junction and accessible through the national highway 66(N.H.66) by taking a left from Madavana junction while travelling south along the Kochi Bypass. Panangad is one of the suburban villages that make up the urban agglomeration of Kochi.

Only 7.5 Km from Vytilla Jn. It was merged into the city during the expansion of Kochi city limits which ends at Kumbalam. The area after the Kumbalam bridge from Aroor belongs to Alappuzha district.

Office

Villages of Panangad, Kumbalam are all under Kumbalam Panchayath, and the panchayath office is located at Panangad. Also veterinary clinic and some other small offices work at the same plaza.

Post office
Panangad post office is an all women office located somewhere at middle of village in a place called Mundempalli.

Hospital
Also primary government health clinic is located nearby post office about 300 meters away from main road. There are few private hospitals and clinics in and around the village itself. Also one of the well known Tertiary hospital V.P.S Lakeshore Hospital is located about a kilometer away from periphery, hence health is never a problem around here.

VPS Lakeshore Hospital
VPS Lakeshore is a multi super-speciality Hospital in Kochi, Kerala. Lakeshore Hospital and Research Centre Ltd was registered as a public limited company in 1996 and started functioning as a multi-specialty hospital in January 2003. The hospital is accredited by the National Accreditation Board for Hospitals & Healthcare Providers (NABH) and has 43 intensive care units and 10 operation theatres. It is one of the largest tertiary care hospital in the state and is managed by VPS Healthcare, which took over the management from Philip Augustine in April 2016. It has air, water and surface ambulance services which was listed by the Limca Book of Records in 2004. Besides medical care, it also conducts several post graduate programs accredited by the Diplomate of National Board. The centre is planning an expansion of its facilities by adding 200,000 sq. ft. to house oncology, cardiology and gastroenterology departments which are on its final stages of construction and are to be opened by the mid-2018.

Law and Order
Panangad Police Station is located at the periphery of panangad village and officers are always available for help at any time and night time patrols are also seen during festival times.

Education
Panangad has a Government L.P school , Government LPS Udayathumvathukkal ,located at Udayathumvathukkal.
It also has a high school named Panangad V.H.S.S(Vocational higher secondary school) and other smaller private schools nearby among which the prominent ones being HIRA public school, Sri Sri RaviShankar school etc. There are two public libraries at panangad, one at kamoth a small junction in panangad and other one at the end of the panangad road which also houses the private bus stand and an abandoned boat jetty.

KUFOS
The Kerala University of Fisheries and Ocean Studies, an autonomous publicly funded institution established on 20 November 2010 and the first Fisheries University in India coming under the Fisheries Ministry is headquartered at Panangad along the NH-66. It is the primary instrument of Kerala state in providing human resources, skills and technology required for the sustainable development of fisheries and the ocean. It acts as a centre of excellence for human resource development in Fisheries and Ocean Studies and the nodal agency to establish relationship with institutions and universities functioning at national and international level.
On Sept of 2017, Kufos inaugurated their amenity centre built close to the junction. The centre will house units that sell the fishlings produced at the university and food products developed by the students, guidance centre for farmers, and banks. The facility, which was set up at a cost of ₹2.60 crore, is open to the public.

Real Estate
Since the boom in development in central city region many of the realtors have moved to suburbs like panangad to build new apartments villas and complexes that are being sold at prices from 20 lakhs to 4.7 crores, some of the main builders include Prime Meridian, Asten Realtors, Anna Properties, etc.
Also God of the cricket Sachin Tendulkar has a property at Panangad offered by Prime meridian which he has visited only once.
Since panangad is basically a village that is being developed to a suburb, many new shops and trends started building up at panangad including passion to custom bikes among the youth and large scale real estate frauds committed by roma constructions.

Religion
Panangad have a place of worship at every km of the road which includes mosques, temples and churches which are all kept very neat and serene.

Transport
Panangad is a hub for many intra-city buses that travel through the main city parts which usually starts from the end of Panangad road which is a bus station and ends at Aluva bus station and returns to Panangad for docking and cleaning.

Private buses are available every 5–10 minutes, but public buses like kurtc are very low in number- the reason mainly being that roads are not big enough to accommodate large buses used by kurtc usually called as "aana bus". Though low floor buses were once introduced through this route, they didn't endure for long since the road didn't have enough width to handle two buses at same time in any location. Since being connected to Kochi Bypass at Madavana junction, traversing to any part of the city is a lot easier using public transport services, though most of the families in the area own at least a vehicle in their house.

At the end of Panangad road where buses are sheltered, the location is open to Riverside.

Nearby village-Cheppanam
Cheppanam is a small village that is connected to panangad which were earlier mostly fields used in agriculture which now houses realty constructions including flats, boat clubs etc.

References

Islands of Kerala
Neighbourhoods in Kochi
Islands of India
Populated places in India